Rebaelliun is a Brazilian death metal band that was founded in 1998. Musically they are similar to their country mates Krisiun. After the release of their promo tape, the band was contracted by the Dutch label Hammerheart Records, who released their debut album Burn the Promised Land in 1999. The release was followed by a European tour.

History
The band recorded an EP, Bringer of War, featuring a Morbid Angel cover. Shortly thereafter a second album was released, entitled Annihilation, which was followed by a second European tour. Various problems eventually caused the band to dissolve in 2001. After a hiatus of 13 years, Rebaelliun announced that it would return to the stages in 2015.
According to a quotation in his official personal page, Fabiano Penna (guitarist and founding member) said that Rebaelliun is now reunited again (with all the original members from the previous line up) to write down a new chapter of brutality in Rebaelliun's history. A new, third album and a worldwide tour was already planned for 2016 as reported by the website, Metalmedia. According to Metallian encyclopedia the members had spoken about reforming over the years.

"It’s been a long time I’ve wanted to share these news, but now it’s time: me, Lohy, Sandro and Ronaldo have finally decided to reunite again to write a new chapter in the history of Rebaelliun! We will prepare our third album and consequently play a tour to promote it in 2016, among other plans we have. I would like to thank for all the endless support we have received from people from many countries on the last years, people who’s always asking and talking about this reunion, and that kept our name alive after so long. It would be impossible to name all of you here, but you know who you are. More news soon. At war!!" 
    
Fabiano Penna Corrêa (guitars) had been involved with Brazilian death/black metal combo Horned God with whom he released an album on the French label Listenable Records. A few years later he formed The Ordher with Nephasth members Fabio Lentino and Mauricio Weimar, with whom he released their debut Weaponize on October 23, 2007 through death metal specialist label Unique Leader Records. Poland's Empire Records released the album during late March 2008 through license in Poland. He has since resumed playing for Rebaelliun.

Sandro Moreira (drums) joined long-standing Brazilian death metal act Mental Horror. He played drums on their third and most successful album, 2007's Blemished Redemption. The album was released through Mutilation Records (Brazil) and Germany's Animate Records did the vinyl release and Poland's Empire Records released the album during mid-August 2007 through license in Poland. He then returned to Rebaelliun.

Marcello Marzari (vocals/bass) worked for the tattoo/piercing company Renegade Studio. It is unclear whether he has continued with this occupation after leaving Rebaelliun prior to their 2001 album Annihilation. Marzari has since joined Brazilian death metal band Abhorrence, who are signed to French label Listenable Records.

Little has been heard of Lohy Fabiano (bass/vocals on Annihilation) and guitarist Ronaldo Lima until Pennas's statements about band's reunion in 2015 and the new album 2016's, The Hell's Decrees.

On February 27, 2018, it was announced that guitarist Fabiano Penna had died.

In July 2021, Rebaelliun announced that they had begun recording new album that is expected to be released in 2022.

On June 3, 2022, vocalist and bassist Lohy Fabiano died from cardio-respiratory arrest. A month later, the band announced Bruno Añaña as his replacement.

Members 
Current
 Sandro Moreira – drums (1998–2002, 2015–present)
 Evandro Passos – guitars, backing vocals (2018–present)
 Bruno Añaña – bass, vocals (2022–present)

Former
 Fabiano Penna – guitars, backing vocals (1998–2002, 2015–2018) (died 2018)
 Ronaldo Lima – guitars (1998–2002, 2015–2016)
 Marcello Marzari – bass, vocals (1998–2000)
 Lohy Fabiano – bass, vocals (2000–2002, 2015–2022) (died 2022)

Timeline

Discography

Studio albums 

 Burn the Promised Land (2000)
 Annihilation (2001)
 The Hell's Decrees (2016)

Extended plays 

 At War (1999)
 Bringer of War (2000)

See also 
Krisiun
Mental Horror
Torture Squad

References

External links 

[ Rebaelliun] at Allmusic
Rebaelliun at MusicMight
 Metalmedia

Brazilian death metal musical groups
Brazilian heavy metal musical groups
Musical groups established in 1998
Musical quintets
Musical groups disestablished in 2002
1998 establishments in Brazil
2002 disestablishments in Brazil